Justin is the debut album of Justin Lo, released on November 29, 2005.

Track listing
"好人"– 3:18
"我不是好人" – 4:09
"Superstar" – 3:40
"Loving You" – 3:53
"Erica" – 4:00
"命硬" – 3:38
"我有今日" – 5:18
"冰淇淋之味" – 3:23
"Best Thing In My Life" – 3:05
"White Christmas" – 3:19
"好人" (Original) – 3:47

Sales

Note that since the record market of Hong Kong is significantly smaller than that of the North American market, the definitions of "Gold" and "Platinum" statuses are scaled down accordingly. By Hong Kong standards, artists only need to sell 25,000 copies of an album for that album to receive Gold status. Meanwhile, Platinum status need 50,000 copies.

External links
Justin in YesAsia.com
Justin in Yahoo! Music

Justin Lo albums
2005 debut albums